Huaraches (singular huarache ; derived from warachi in Purépecha) are a type of Mexican sandal, Pre-Columbian in origin.

History

The name "huarache" is derived from the Purépecha language term , and directly translates into English as sandal.

Early forms have been found in and traced to the countryside farming communities of Jalisco, Michoacan, Guanajuato and Yucatan. Originally of all-leather construction, the thong structure around the main foot is still traditionally made with hand-woven braided leather straps.

Huaraches gained popularity in North America thanks to their adoption as part of the 1960s hippie lifestyle. By the end of the 20th century they were to be found all over North and South America.

Styles

Traditional huarache designs vary greatly, but are always very simple. Originally made of all-leather, later designs included woven string soles and occasionally thin wooden soles. Subsequently, more elaborate upper designs were created by saddlers and leather workers.

The modern huarache developed from the adoption in the 1930s of rubber soles developed from used rubber car-tires. Modern designs vary in style from a simplistic sandal to a more complex shoe, using both traditional leather as well as more modern synthetic materials.

Many shoes claim to be huaraches, but they are only considered traditional huaraches if they are handmade, and have a woven-leather form in the upper.

Media
Huaraches are mentioned in the lyrics of the Beach Boys songs "Surfin' U.S.A." and "Noble Surfer", in the novel Ask the Dust, written by John Fante (Camilla Lopez's shoes), and also in the novel On the Road, written by Jack Kerouac. Huaraches figure prominently into the title and plot of the 1964 Looney Tunes cartoon short, Senõrella and the Glass Huarache, a Mexican-themed adaptation of the Cinderella fairy tale. Skeeter Phelan wears a pair of the shoes, which her traditionalist Southern mother hates, in the Kathryn Stockett novel The Help. Doc Sportello, the detective from Thomas Pynchon's Inherent Vice, wears a pair of huaraches. He eventually loses one shoe and finishes the adventure using only the other one. In the Seinfeld episode "The Millennium" Elayne attempts to buy a pair of Huaraches from a disinterested shop owner.

See also
 Ho Chi Minh sandals, Vietnamese footwear made from old tires 
 Huarache (running shoe)
 Waraji
 Xero Shoes

References

Sandals
Shoes
Folk footwear
Mexican clothing